The Voice of America is the second studio album by English band Cabaret Voltaire. It was released in July 1980, through record label Rough Trade.

Critical reception 

Trouser Press wrote that "the new material shows much greater focus and cleaner production than the older, with the mantra technique rising in place of the former chaotic electro-noise." AllMusic called it "not as spectacular as what would follow, but not without its own set of thrills."

SF Weekly wrote that "the music keeps moving outward, emitting boomerang-like signals that are only coming back to us today: The Moog-y skronk of 'Partially Submerged', part Krautrock and part free-jazz, anticipates Cologne's unfettered improv glitches, Radiohead's sprawling rock, and Aphex Twin's Dramamine ambiance."

Track listing

Samples 

"Stay Out Of It" samples three phrases from the Outer Limits episode "Demon with a Glass Hand": "the third part of your brain... you know where it is?", "don't kill me, please... please..." and "the hand... tell me what to do".

The opening of the album is taken from newsreel footage of policemen being given instructions how to cope with Beatles fans before a Beatles concert in 1966.

Personnel 
Cabaret Voltaire
 Richard H. Kirk – guitar, wind instruments
 Stephen Mallinder – vocals, bass guitar, electronic percussion
 Chris Watson – synthesizers, tapes
 Haydn Boyes Weston – drums

 Technical

 Cabaret Voltaire – recording, production
 Porky – mastering

Trivia 

The run-out area etchings on side one include the question "WHERE IS THE THIRD MANTRA?" which is a reference to their earlier release Three Mantras.

References

External links 

 

1980 albums
Cabaret Voltaire (band) albums
Rough Trade Records albums